Kingaroy Airport or Sir Joh Bjelke-Petersen Airport  is an airport located  south of Kingaroy, Queensland, Australia.

History 
The airport opened in 1931 as Kingaroy Aerodrome. It was taken over by the Royal Australian Air Force in October 1941 as Landing Ground No. 375 and formally acquired by the Commonwealth government in June 1943, becoming RAAF Station Kingaroy. Four runways and 180 buildings were constructed between July 1942 and May 1943. It was downgraded to an unstaffed Emergency Landing Ground in June 1945 and returned to civilian control in July 1946.

Current facilities 
There are no scheduled services but the airport is used by charter flights to the gas fields in far west Queensland.

The airport is used for gliding.

See also
 List of airports in Queensland

References

External links
 South Burnett Aerodromes

Airports in Queensland
Queensland in World War II